Campanorco is an extinct genus of notoungulate mammal from the Middle Eocene Lumbrera Formation, Argentina,  South America and the only member of the family Campanorcidae.

References

Bibliography 
 McKenna, Malcolm C., and Bell, Susan K. 1997. Classification of Mammals Above the Species Level. Columbia University Press, New York, 631 pp. 

Typotheres
Eocene mammals of South America
Divisaderan
Mustersan
Casamayoran
Bartonian life
Paleogene Argentina
Fossils of Argentina
Salta Basin
Fossil taxa described in 1984
Prehistoric placental genera